María Rosa Salgado (1929–1995) was a Spanish actress. She appeared in around twenty films including It Happened in Broad Daylight. In the early 1950s she moved to Hollywood for her launch as an international star. After the failure of the initiative she returned to Spain and retired form acting in 1960, after her marriage to bullfighter Pepe Dominguín. She briefly returned to film and theatre after their separation, including performances in roles for directors such as Jorge Grau ("Chica de club"), Manuel Gutiérrez Aragón ("Sonámbulos") and Jaime Chávarri ("A un dios desconocido").

Filmography

References

Bibliography 
 Hortelano, Lorenzo J. Torres. Directory of World Cinema: Spain. Intellect Books, 2011.

External links 
 

1929 births
1995 deaths
Spanish film actresses
People from Madrid
20th-century Spanish actresses
Spanish expatriates in the United States